Thomas Sauer (November 11, 1970 — March 24, 2020) was an American retired mixed martial artist. A professional competitor from 1998 to 2012, he competed for RINGS and the World Fighting Alliance.

Background
A native of Cleveland, Sauer moved with his family to Ocala, Florida in 1981 at the age of 11. From a young age, he began wrestling and karate.

Mixed martial arts career

Early career
Having made his debut in 1998, Sauer quickly moved to 3–0 with a win over Jeff Monson before being handed his first professional defeat at the hands of Travis Fulton.

After five more wins followed by consecutive defeats to Bobby Hoffman and John Dixson, respectively, Sauer began competing for the RINGS promotion.

RINGS
Sauer made his RINGS debut on May 20, 2000, winning via first-round submission. After another win followed by a knockout of Valentijn Overeem, Sauer was defeated via doctor stoppage from a cut against Vladimir Matyushenko.

Sauer would go 6–5 in his next 11 fights before facing off against Enson Inoue at SuperBrawl 35 on April 16, 2004. Sauer won via first-round TKO in arguably the biggest win of his career.

Independent promotions
Sauer went 7–3 in the last ten fights of his career, last defeating Ruben Villareal via first-round submission in 2012.

Personal life
Sauer founded his own gym, "Team Trauma" in 1998 in Ocala, Florida. 
 
Sauer was a firefighter and EMT from 1996 until his retirement in 2019.
 
Sauer also had his own aluminum construction company in Ocala, FL.

Following his death in 2020, Sauer was inducted into the Florida MMA Hall of Fame.
 
In his community, he was famous for his big heart as well as strong hands. He constantly and without hesitation helped friends and strangers alike, be it an uplifting conversation, meal, or surprise Christmas gifts. Sauer was happily married to the love of his life, Sherrie Sauer for 10 years with whom he just built his dream home at the unexpected time of his death. Sauer had 4 children and 2 stepchildren who were the pride and joy of his life. 
 
He lived his life with Tourette Syndrome, and made light of the situation often. He would often make an off the wall or humorous statement then say that no one could be upset with him for it because no one would want to pick on the man with Tourette’s. Living with the disorder was a struggle for him as a child, but ultimately led him to his professional fighting career. He found peace in the control fighting offered him.

|-
| Win
| align=center| 25–12
| Ruben Villareal
| Submission
| R.F.C. 26: Legends Return
| 
| align=center| 1
| align=center| 0:40
| Ocala, Florida, United States
| 
|-
| Win
| align=center| 24–12
| Jimmy Ambriz
| TKO (punches)
| AOF 13: Amaya vs. Lawrence
| 
| align=center| 1
| align=center| 4:03
| Estero, Florida, United States
| 
|-
| Win
| align=center| 23–12
| Liron Wilson
| TKO (punches)
| AOF 7: Payday
| 
| align=center| 2
| align=center| 0:54
| Tampa, Florida, United States
| 
|-
| Loss
| align=center| 22–12
| Marcio Cruz
| TKO (punches)
| AOF 4: Damage
| 
| align=center| 2
| align=center| 3:43
| Tampa, Florida, United States
| 
|-
| Win
| align=center| 22–11
| Mike Hueser
| Submission (rear-naked choke)
| Southern Fight League: Smoky Mountain Brawl
| 
| align=center| 1
| align=center| 2:52
| Asheville, North Carolina, United States
| 
|-
| Win
| align=center| 21–11
| Rocky Batastini
| Submission (guillotine choke)
| AOF 2: Rumble at Robarts 2
| 
| align=center| 1
| align=center| 0:17
| Sarasota, Florida, United States
| 
|-
| Win
| align=center| 20–11
| Matt Thomas
| Submission (armbar)
| WEF: WEF 8
| 
| align=center| 2
| align=center| 2:12
| Kissimmee, Florida, United States
| 
|-
| Win
| align=center| 19–11
| Leo Sylvest
| TKO (submission to punches)
| CFC 2: Combat Fighting Championship 2
| 
| align=center| 1
| align=center| 0:13
| Orlando, Florida, United States
| 
|-
| Loss
| align=center| 18–11
| Branden Lee Hinkle
| TKO (punches)
| WEF: Sin City
| 
| align=center| 1
| align=center| 2:19
| Las Vegas, Nevada, United States
| 
|-
| Loss
| align=center| 18–10
| Andy Montana
| KO (punch)
| IFC 20: Eve Of Destruction
| 
| align=center| 1
| align=center| 1:29
| Salt Lake City, Utah, United States
| 
|-
| Win
| align=center| 18–9
| Enson Inoue
| TKO (punches)
| SB 35: SuperBrawl 35
| 
| align=center| 1
| align=center| 4:14
| Honolulu, Hawaii, United States
|Return to Heavyweight.
|-
| Loss
| align=center| 17–9
| Bill Mahood
| TKO (punches and elbows)
| IFC 17: Battleground Boise
| 
| align=center| 2
| align=center| 3:10
| Boise, Idaho, United States
| 
|-
| Win
| align=center| 17–8
| Allan Sullivan
| Submission (arm triangle choke)
| IFC 16: Global Domination
| 
| align=center| 2
| align=center| 0:39
| Denver, Colorado, United States
|
|-
| Win
| align=center| 16–8
| Sean Gray
| Submission (guillotine choke)
| IFC 16: Global Domination
| 
| align=center| 1
| align=center| 0:46
| Denver, Colorado, United States
|Light Heavyweight debut.
|-
| Win
| align=center| 15–8
| Crafton Wallace
| Submission (rear-naked choke)
| WEFC 3: Shake
| 
| align=center| 1
| align=center| 1:12
| Jacksonville, Florida, United States
| 
|-
| Loss
| align=center| 14–8
| Rodney Glunder
| TKO (doctor stoppage)
| RINGS Holland: One Moment In Time
| 
| align=center| 2
| align=center| 3:52
| Utrecht, Netherlands
| 
|-
| Loss
| align=center| 14–7
| Marvin Eastman
| TKO (elbows)
| WFA 2: Level 2
| 
| align=center| 2
| align=center| 1:35
| Las Vegas, Nevada, United States
| 
|-
| Win
| align=center| 14–6
| Bill Vucick
| Submission (keylock)
| WEF 12: World Extreme Fighting 12
| 
| align=center| 2
| align=center| 2:30
| Steubenville, Ohio, United States
| 
|-
| Win
| align=center| 13–6
| Rob Morris
| TKO (submission to punches)
| RSF 6: Mayhem in Myers
| 
| align=center| 1
| align=center| 0:35
| Fort Myers, Florida, United States
| 
|-
| Loss
| align=center| 12–6
| Hiromitsu Kanehara
| TKO (punches)
| RINGS: King of Kings 2000 Block B
| 
| align=center| 1
| align=center| 4:14
| Osaka, Japan
| 
|-
| Win
| align=center| 12–5
| Andrei Kopylov
| KO (punch)
| RINGS: King of Kings 2000 Block B
| 
| align=center| 1
| align=center| 0:10
| Osaka, Japan
| 
|-
| Loss
| align=center| 11–5
| Aaron Brink
| TKO (punches)
| RINGS USA: Rising Stars Final
| 
| align=center| 2
| align=center| 4:29
| Moline, Illinois, United States
| 
|-
| Loss
| align=center| 11–4
| Vladimir Matyushenko
| TKO (cut)
| WEF: New Blood Conflict
| 
| align=center| 2
| align=center| 2:17
| 
| 
|-
| Win
| align=center| 11–3
| Valentijn Overeem
| KO (punches)
| RINGS USA: Rising Stars Block B
| 
| align=center| 1
| align=center| 0:35
| Honolulu, Hawaii
| 
|-
| Win
| align=center| 10–3
| Mike Dresch
| KO (punches)
| RINGS USA: Rising Stars Block B
| 
| align=center| 1
| align=center| 0:13
| Honolulu, Hawaii
| 
|-
| Win
| align=center| 9–3
| Alexander Bezroutchkin
| Submission (rear-naked choke)
| RINGS Russia: Russia vs. The World
| 
| align=center| 1
| align=center| 3:30
| Yekaterinburg, Sverdlovsk Oblast, Russia
| 
|-
| Loss
| align=center| 8–3
| John Dixson
| Submission (heel hook)
| WEF 7: Stomp in the Swamp
| 
| align=center| 1
| align=center| 2:00
| Kenner, Louisiana, United States
| 
|-
| Loss
| align=center| 8–2
| Bobby Hoffman
| Submission (guillotine choke)
| EC 27: Extreme Challenge 27
| 
| align=center| 1
| align=center| 4:46
| Davenport, Iowa, United States
| 
|-
| Win
| align=center| 8–1
| David Dodd
| TKO (punches)
| EC 27: Extreme Challenge 27
| 
| align=center| 1
| align=center| 2:20
| Davenport, Iowa, United States
| 
|-
| Win
| align=center| 7–1
| Wade Rome
| Submission (triangle choke)
| WEF 5: World Extreme Fighting 5
| 
| align=center| 0
| align=center| 0:00
| DeLand, Florida, United States
| 
|-
| Win
| align=center| 6–1
| John Horning
| Submission (side choke)
| XCC: Xtreme Combat Championships 2
| 
| align=center| 0
| align=center| 0:00
| Florida, United States
| 
|-
| Win
| align=center| 5–1
| Victor Vincelette
| TKO (injury)
| WEF 2: World Extreme Fighting 2
| 
| align=center| 1
| align=center| 0:10
| 
| 
|-
| Win
| align=center| 4–1
| Efrain Ruiz
| TKO (submission to punches)
| WEF 1: World Extreme Fighting 1
| 
| align=center| 1
| align=center| N/A
| 
| 
|-
| Loss
| align=center| 3–1
| Travis Fulton
| TKO (submission to punches)
| EC 21: Extreme Challenge 21
| 
| align=center| 1
| align=center| 1:57
| Hayward, Wisconsin, United States
| 
|-
| Win
| align=center| 3–0
| Jeff Monson
| Submission (rear-naked choke)
| EC 20: Extreme Challenge 20
| 
| align=center| 1
| align=center| 3:47
| Davenport, Iowa, United States
| 
|-
| Win
| align=center| 2–0
| David Giannotti
| Submission (choke)
| WVF: Orlando 2
| 
| align=center| 1
| align=center| 1:13
| Orlando, Florida, United States
| 
|-
| Win
| align=center| 1–0
| Joe Campanella
| N/A
| EC 19: Extreme Challenge 19
| 
| align=center| 1
| align=center| 0:34
| Hayward, Wisconsin, United States
|

See also
List of male mixed martial artists

References

External links
 Hope for Humanity: MMA Fighter Tommy Sauer is a Really Nice Dude at CagedInsider.com
 
 

1970 births
American male mixed martial artists
Light heavyweight mixed martial artists
Heavyweight mixed martial artists
Mixed martial artists utilizing wrestling
Mixed martial artists utilizing karate
American male karateka
2020 deaths